Meru South District, also known as Nithi District, was an unconstitutionally created district of Kenya, located in that country's Eastern Province. In 1992, it was split from the large Meru District, along with Meru Central District, Meru North District, and Tharaka District. In September 2009, the Supreme Court ruled that its creation was unconstitutional, and that it belonged in Tharaka-Nithi District (which became Tharaka-Nithi County the following year).

The area of Meru South District is the home of the Ameru tribe. The people there are now predominantly Christian — Methodist, Presbyterian, Roman Catholic, and other denominations, reflecting the work of missionaries — with minorities of Indian descent, who are mainly Hindus, and of Arab descent, who are Muslims. There are also some residents of European, predominantly British, ancestry. The Chuka people are the dominant sub-tribe in the area, occupying the more arable upepr region while the Tharaka  people occupy the lower Igamba'ngombe division.

The district headquarters was in Chuka. The district had one constituency: Chuka/Igambang'ombe Constituency

References

External links 
 Office for the Coordination of Humanitarian Affairs – Kenya AdminLevels 1-4 (.pdf)

 
Former districts of Kenya